"On The Painted Desert - Rampant Colors" is a maxi single by Japanese electronica/rock band Boom Boom Satellites. It was initially released on April 1, 1999, as the fifth single from their second album Out Loud.

Track listing

Personnel
Credits adapted from liner notes.
 Drums – Naoki Hirai
 Engineer – Fumiya Hattori
 Guitar – Michiyuki Kawashima, Shunji Mori
 Programmed By, Bass – Masayuki Nakano
 Vocals – Michiyuki Kawashima
 Written-By, Producer – Boom Boom Satellites

References

External links 
 Boom Boom Satellites official website

2001 songs
Boom Boom Satellites songs